Knockfin is a townland in the civil parish of Drumreilly, barony of Tullyhaw, County Cavan, Ireland.

Geography

Knockfin is bounded on the west by Curraghnabania and Seltanahunshin townlands and on the east by Corraleehanbeg, Garryfliugh and Prabagh townlands. Its chief geographical features are Sliabh an Iarainn mountain on whose eastern slope it lies, mountain streams, waterfalls, a lime-kiln and dug wells. It is traversed by minor public roads and rural lanes. The townland covers 228 statute acres.

History

The landlord of the townland in the 19th century was the Beresford Estate.

The Tithe Applotment Books for 1834 spells the name as Kockfin and list three tithepayers in the townland.

The 1836 Ordnance survey Namebooks state- The soil is light yellow clay intermixed with sand & limestone, neither of which is quarried or used in any way.

Griffith's Valuation of 1857 lists five landholders in the townland.

Census

In the 1901 census of Ireland, there were seven families listed in the townland.

In the 1911 census of Ireland, there were seven families listed in the townland.

Antiquities

 Stone bridges over the streams

References

External links
The IreAtlas Townland Data Base

Townlands of County Cavan